Redecker is a surname. Notable people with the surname include:

 Gottlieb Redecker (1871–1945), German engineer and architect
 Johann Wilhelm Redecker (1836–1911), German missionary
 Júlio Redecker (1956–2007), Brazilian politician

German-language surnames